Alyce clover is a common name for several plants in the genus Alysicarpus and may refer to:

Alysicarpus vaginalis, native to Africa and Asia